The 1960–61 NCAA men's ice hockey season began in November 1960 and concluded with the 1961 NCAA Men's Ice Hockey Tournament's championship game on March 18, 1961 at the University of Denver Arena in Denver, Colorado. This was the 14th season in which an NCAA ice hockey championship was held and is the 67th year overall where an NCAA school fielded a team.

Regular season

Season tournaments

Standings

1961 NCAA Tournament

Note: * denotes overtime period(s)

Player stats

Scoring leaders
The following players led the league in points at the conclusion of the season.

GP = Games played; G = Goals; A = Assists; Pts = Points; PIM = Penalty minutes

Leading goaltenders
The following goaltenders led the league in goals against average at the end of the regular season while playing at least 33% of their team's total minutes.

GP = Games played; Min = Minutes played; W = Wins; L = Losses; OT = Overtime/shootout losses; GA = Goals against; SO = Shutouts; SV% = Save percentage; GAA = Goals against average

Awards

NCAA

WCHA

References

External links
College Hockey Historical Archives
1960–61 NCAA Standings

 
NCAA